Nikita Ababiy (born October 20, 1998) is an American professional boxer of Russian descent. As an amateur he was a Jr. Golden Gloves National Champion as well as two-time World Ring Side Champion. Ababiy was also in the USA Youth Team in 2016.

Professional career
Ababiy made his professional debut under Eddie Hearn's Matchroom Boxing USA banner on October 6, 2018, at the Wintrust Arena in Chicago, Illinois. The fight was streamed live, exclusively on DAZN in the U.S. as part of the undercard of Jessie Vargas vs. Thomas Dulorme. Ababiy won the fight via first round knockout (KO). Ababiy's second professional fight was against American welterweight Javier Rodriquez at the Kansas Star Arena in Kansas on November 17, 2018. The bout was stopped in the first round and the referee declared Ababiy the winner by TKO. Ababiy's third professional fight was on the undercard of Dmitry Bivol vs. Joe Smith Jr. against American Cory Dulaney on March 9, 2018. Ababiy got a TKO victory in the first round, achieving his third first round knockout victory in a row.

In April 2019, Ababiy made his first appearance outside the United States at The O2 Arena in London. He secured a second-round TKO victory over Dimitri Faltin to take his record to 4-0 and make it 4 consecutive knockout victories. Two months later, Ababiy defeated Juan Francisco Lopez Barajas of Mexico with a first-round knockout, in Madison Square Garden, New York City. In July 2019, Ababiy won by unanimous decision against Cuban Yunier Calzada after 6 rounds. In Ababiy's seventh professional fight, on November 5, 2019, he defeated Isiah Seldon via first round knockout, bringing his knockout total to 6 out of 7 fights. In his eighth professional fight, he won by disqualification against Jonathan Batista on the KSI vs. Logan Paul II undercard after Batista continued to fight after the round ending bell had been sounded. This brought Ababiy's record to 8-0 with 6 first-round victories.

Professional boxing record

References 

American male boxers
People from Richmond, Virginia
Middleweight boxers
1998 births
Living people
Boxers from Virginia